The 2022 Oklahoma Sooners football team  represented the University of Oklahoma during the 2022 NCAA Division I FBS football season, the 128th season for the  Oklahoma Sooners. They played their home games at Gaylord Family Oklahoma Memorial Stadium in Norman, Oklahoma. They are a charter member of the Big 12 Conference. 2022 marked the first time the Sooners finished with a losing record since 1998.  They were led by first-year head coach Brent Venables.

Previous season 
The Sooners finished the 2021 season 10–2, 7–2 in Big 12 play. Finishing 3rd in the conference the Sooners failed to win the conference championship for the first time since 2014. Following the end of the regular season, Head Coach Lincoln Riley departed for the head coaching job at USC finishing his time with the Sooners with a 55–10 record. Following his departure Bob Stoops was named the interim head coach and would go on to coach the team in their bowl game.
The Sooners received an invite to play in the 2021 Alamo Bowl against Oregon.

Offseason

Position key

NFL draft

Offseason departures

Outgoing transfers  
The Sooners lost thirteen players via transfer portal for the 2022 season.

Additions
Incoming transfers

Recruiting class

  
  
  
  
  
  
  
 
  
  
  
  
  
  
  
  

  
  
  
  
  

*= 247Sports Composite rating; ratings are out of 1.00. (five stars= 1.00–.98, four stars= .97–.90, three stars= .80–.89, two stars= .79–.70, no stars= <70)
†= Despite being rated as a four and five star recruit by ESPN, On3.com, Rivals.com and 247Sports.com, TBD received a four star 247Sports Composite rating.
Δ= Left the Oklahoma program following signing but prior to the 2022 season.

Overall class rankings

Returning starters

Offense

Defense

Special teams

† Indicates player was a starter in 2021 but missed all of 2022 due to injury.

Preseason

Award watch lists
Listed in the order that they were released

Big 12 media poll
The preseason poll was released on July 7, 2022.

First place votes in 

Preseason Big-12 awards
2022 Preseason All-Big 12 teams

Source:

Personnel

Roster

Coaching staff

Depth chart

True Freshman

Schedule
Oklahoma and the Big 12 announced the 2022 football schedule on December 1, 2021. The 2022 schedule consists of 6 home games, 5 away games and 1 neutral-site game in the regular season. The Sooners will host 2 non-conference games against UTEP and Kent State and will travel to Nebraska. Oklahoma will host Kansas, Kansas State, Baylor and Oklahoma State, and travel to TCU, Iowa State, West Virginia, and Texas Tech in regular-season conference play. Oklahoma will play Texas in Dallas, Texas at the Cotton Bowl Stadium in the Red River Showdown, the 118th game played in the series.

Game summaries

vs. UTEP

vs. Kent State

at Nebraska

vs Kansas State

at TCU

vs. Texas

vs. No. 19 Kansas

at Iowa State

vs Baylor

at West Virginia

vs No. 22 Oklahoma State

at Texas Tech

vs. No.13 Florida State  (2022 Cheez-It Bowl)

Statistics

Team

Individual Leaders

Defense

Key: POS: Position, SOLO: Solo Tackles, AST: Assisted Tackles, TOT: Total Tackles, TFL: Tackles-for-loss, SACK: Quarterback Sacks, INT: Interceptions, BU: Passes Broken Up, PD: Passes Defended, QBH: Quarterback Hits, FR: Fumbles Recovered, FF: Forced Fumbles, BLK: Kicks or Punts Blocked, SAF: Safeties, TD : Touchdown

Special teams

Scoring
Oklahoma vs Non-Conference Opponents

Oklahoma vs Big 12 Opponents

Oklahoma vs All Opponents

Rankings

After the season

Final statistics

Awards and Big 12 honors

All-Americans

Bowl games

All Star games

NFL draft

The NFL Draft will be held at Arrowhead Stadium in Kansas City, MO on April 27–29, 2023.
 
Sooners who were picked in the 2023 NFL Draft:

References

Oklahoma
Oklahoma Sooners football seasons
Oklahoma Sooners football